Convulsionists of Tangiers (also The Fanatics of Tangier) is an 1837–38 painting by the French Romantic visual artist Eugène Delacroix. It is held by the Minneapolis Institute of Art.

History
In 1832, while in Morocco as part of a French diplomatic mission, Delacroix witnessed the devotional activities of members of the Isawiyya brotherhood in Tangiers.

Initially the artist did a sketch from his memories of the event, then later several watercolors, and finally four of five years later this painting.

References

Paintings by Eugène Delacroix
Orientalist paintings
1838 paintings